Knaz may refer to:
KNAZ-TV, a television station in Flagstaff, Arizona
Kenaz or Knaz, meaning "hunter", the name of several persons in the Hebrew Bible
Shaul Knaz (born 1939), Israeli artist and writer

See also
Knyaz, a historical Slavic title